Michael Joseph "Iron Mike" Donahue (June 14, 1876 – December 11, 1960) was an American football player, coach of football, basketball, baseball, tennis, track, soccer, and golf, and a college athletics administrator. He served as the head football coach at Auburn University (1904–1906, 1908–1922), at Louisiana State University (1923–1927), and at Spring Hill College (1934).

In 18 seasons coaching football at Auburn, Donahue amassed a record of 106–35–5 and had three squads go undefeated with four more suffering only one loss. His .743 career winning percentage is the second highest in Auburn history, surpassing notable coaches such as John Heisman and Ralph "Shug" Jordan. Donahue Drive in Auburn, Alabama, on which Jordan–Hare Stadium is located and the Tiger Walk takes place, is named in his honor, as is Mike Donahue Drive on the LSU campus.

Donahue also coached basketball (1905–1921), baseball, track, and soccer (1912–?) at Auburn and baseball (1925–1926) and tennis (1946–1947) at LSU. He was inducted as a coach into the College Football Hall of Fame as part of its inaugural class in 1951.

Early life
Donahue was born in County Kerry, Ireland and attended Yale University. There he lettered in football, basketball, track and cross country. Donahue played as a substitute quarterback on the football team, and was twice captain of the scrub team. He graduated in 1903. Donahue stood just 5'4" tall, with red hair and blue eyes.

Coaching career

Auburn

Football
Upon graduating college, Donahue became the tenth head coach of the Auburn Tigers football team beginning in 1904, the same year Vanderbilt hired Dan McGugin. Former Auburn head coach Billy Watkins led the effort to acquire Donahue. Contrasting with McGugin, Fuzzy Woodruff wrote that Donahue was "a mouse-like little man with little to say, save when aroused, on which he was capable of utterances of great fire and fervor." His teams were led by his 7–2–2 defense.

His coaching career saw immediate success, as his first team went undefeated at 5–0 including a defeat of rival Alabama which was the purpose for his hiring. Donahue's Auburn teams won six Southern Intercollegiate Athletic Association titles, in 1904, 1908, 1910, 1913, 1914 and 1919.

Donahue's 1913 and 1914 teams went undefeated, with the 1914 squad allowing zero points to be scored all year, and have been recognized as national champions by various, retroactive selectors including Billingsley Report and the Howell Ratings. From 1913 into 1915, Auburn went 22 consecutive games without a loss. One source on the 1913 team reads "Coach Donahue loved the fullback dive and would run the play over and over again before sending the elusive Newell wide on a sweep."

Donahue's 1920 team averaged a then-school record 36.9 points per game. His last team was considered one of the best teams Auburn turned out in the first half of the 20th century.

His .743 career winning percentage is the second highest in Auburn history, surpassing notable coaches including John Heisman, Ralph "Shug" Jordan, Pat Dye, Terry Bowden, and Tommy Tuberville.

Athletic director and other sports
Donahue also served as athletic director, basketball coach, baseball coach, track coach, and soccer coach while at Auburn.

Basketball
In 1905, Donahue initiated the school's first official varsity basketball team, which went 3–1–1, including victories over Georgia Tech and Tulane, a two-point loss to the Columbus (Georgia) All-Stars, and a tie with the Birmingham Athletic Club. Under Donahue, basketball practice was a contact sport; a former player once lamented, "He never bothered calling fouls--said it slowed up the game."

Soccer
In 1912, he coached Auburn's first soccer team. By the beginning of the 1915 season, Auburn was only playing athletic clubs and prep schools and had yet to participate in an intercollegiate match, due to a lack of soccer programs at other Southern colleges.

LSU
Donahue went on to become the seventeenth head football coach at LSU in 1923 and had a 23–19–3 record over five seasons before retiring from coaching after the 1927 season. The 1924 team beat Indiana. The 1927 team tied Wallace Wade's Alabama Crimson Tide.

He also served briefly as the head coach of the LSU Tigers baseball team (1925–1926), compiling a record of 15–15–3, and as the head men's tennis coach at LSU (1946–1947), tallying a mark of 0–7. In 1944 and 1945, Donahue served as the head coach of the LSU Tigers golf team.

Spring Hill
Donahue served as the athletic director at Spring Hill College from 1929 to 1936. In 1931, Donahue assisted Pat Browne with the football team at Spring Hill. In 1934, Donahue reentered the active coaching ranks, when he was hired as head coach and mentored his son, Mike, Jr.

Death and legacy
Donahue died on December 11, 1960 in Baton Rouge, Louisiana.

Head coaching record

Football

Basketball

Baseball

See also 
 List of college football head coaches with non-consecutive tenure

Notes

References

Bibliography

External links

 

1876 births
1960 deaths
19th-century players of American football
American baseball coaches
American men's basketball coaches
American football quarterbacks
American tennis coaches
Auburn Tigers athletic directors
Auburn Tigers football coaches
Auburn Tigers men's basketball coaches
LSU Tigers baseball coaches
LSU Tigers football coaches
LSU Tigers golf coaches
LSU Tigers tennis coaches
Spring Hill Badgers athletic directors
Spring Hill Badgers football coaches
Yale Bulldogs football players
College golf coaches in the United States
College Football Hall of Fame inductees
People from County Kerry
Irish emigrants to the United States (before 1923)